Ego Lemos is a permaculturist and singer-songwriter from East Timor who sings in his native tongue, Tetum. His song "Balibo" (featured in the 2009 film Balibo) was awarded best original song composed for the screen at the 2009 Screen Music Awards and a 2009 APRA Award for best song in a film. His debut solo album,  produced by Michael Hohnen, was released in 2009. Lemos also plays with the popular East Timorese band Cinco do Oriente, a band named after a band that existed before the 1975 Indonesian invasion of East Timor.

Discography
O Hele Le (2009) - Skinnyfish Music

References

1972 births
APRA Award winners
East Timorese musicians
Living people